Peter Julian Alexander Collins (born 14 January 1951) is an English record producer, arranger, and audio engineer. He has produced records by Gary Moore, Bon Jovi, Billy Squier, Rush, Air Supply, Alice Cooper, Nik Kershaw, Blancmange, Suicidal Tendencies, Queensrÿche, Indigo Girls, Nanci Griffith, Ultraspank, Jermaine Stewart, Jane Wiedlin, October Project, The Cardigans, Rosetta Stone, Josh Joplin, Tracey Ullman, Drake Bell, Ultraspank and The Brian Setzer Orchestra.

Career

In 1976, Collins was signed to Magnet Records and formed a group called Madison, along with Sippy, Peter Spooner and Page 3 girl Cherri Gilham, to perform the pop song "Let It Ring". Collins acted as producer, but the record failed to chart and the group soon disbanded.

Collins formed a production company with Pete Waterman and his early credits as a producer included producing the first two albums for The Lambrettas and their chart hit "Poison Ivy". He moved to Canada in 1985 to produce albums for Rush, first working on Power Windows (1985) and then Hold Your Fire (1987). Known at the time as a pop producer, he brought a more heavily synthesised sound to Rush. After reluctantly declining to work with Rush for their albums Presto and Roll the Bones, he later returned to collaborate with the band for Counterparts and Test for Echo. In both cases, he emphasised a return to Rush's heavier rock sound.

In 1991, he produced Alice Cooper's Hey Stoopid album, which peaked at No. 47 on the Billboard 200 and was the follow-up to the Desmond Child produced Trash album. He also produced the Queensrÿche albums Operation: Mindcrime, Empire (No. 7 on the Billboard 200) and Hear in the Now Frontier. For a time, Collins was referred to as "Mr Big".

References

Further reading
Inglis, Sam (March 2002). "Peter Collins". Sound on Sound.

English record producers
English audio engineers
1951 births
Living people
Musicians from London